"Love You All My Lifetime" is a 1992 song performed by American singer-songwriter Chaka Khan. Written by the songwriting duo of Klarmann/Weber, it was the first track released off of Chaka Khan's The Woman I Am album. "Love You All My Lifetime" was produced by David Gamson and was Chaka Khan's fifth number-one on the US dance chart.  On other US charts, the single went to #2 on the soul singles chart and #68 on the Hot 100.  Overseas, "Love You All My Lifetime", went to #49 in the UK.

Critical reception
Alex Henderson from AllMusic described the song as "appealing". Larry Flick from Billboard wrote, "After numerous disappointments, Khan re-emerges with her most satisfying recording in years. She wraps that one-of-a-kind voice around a slinky and subtle R&B/funk jam that will inject a much-needed breath of fresh air into blah top 40 and urban formats. Fierce remixes by Dave Shaw and Boilerhouse are already kicking up a storm at club level." David Browne from Entertainment Weekly stated that the singer "gives it her all", wrapping her voice around "the delicious hook" of "Love You All My Lifetime".

Charts

Weekly charts

Year-end charts

See also
 List of number-one dance singles of 1992 (U.S.)

References

1992 singles
Chaka Khan songs
1992 songs
Songs written by Felix Weber (songwriter)
Song recordings produced by David Gamson